{{safesubst:#invoke:RfD|||month = March
|day = 19
|year = 2023
|time = 14:17
|timestamp = 20230319141731

|content=
REDIRECT Copyright infringement

}}